Siddharam Satlingappa Mhetre is a member of the 13th Maharashtra Legislative Assembly. He represents the Akkalkot Assembly Constituency. He belongs to the Indian National Congress. He is from  Lingayat community.

References

Maharashtra MLAs 2014–2019
People from Solapur district
Marathi politicians
Year of birth missing (living people)
Living people
Indian National Congress politicians from Maharashtra